"SWLABR" is a song recorded by the British rock band Cream in 1967. It first appeared on the album Disraeli Gears (1967).  Later, the song was the B-side to Cream's "Sunshine of Your Love" single.

Background
The poet Pete Brown wrote the words and Cream's bassist Jack Bruce wrote the music. Bruce sings and plays bass guitar, with Eric Clapton on guitars and Ginger Baker on drums. The title is an initialism for "She Walks Like a Bearded Rainbow". Bruce later said the W stood for "was" rather than "walks".

A live version of "SWLABR" was released on BBC Sessions and the Deluxe Edition of Disraeli Gears, which also includes a four-minute demo version. Several Cream compilation albums include the song, such as Best of Cream, Heavy Cream, Strange Brew: The Very Best of Cream, The Very Best of Cream, Those Were the Days and Gold.

Notes

References

Sources
Clapton, Eric (2007). Clapton: The Autobiography. New York, United States: Broadway Books. pp. g. 74. .
Hjort, Christopher (2007). Strange Brew: Eric Clapton & the British Blues Boom, 1965–1970. London, UK: Jawbone Press. pp. g. 29. .
Ertegün, Ahmet (2006). Classic Albums: Cream – Disraeli Gears (DVD). Eagle Rock Entertainment.

1968 singles
Cream (band) songs
Song recordings produced by Felix Pappalardi
Atco Records singles
Polydor Records singles
Songs written by Jack Bruce
1967 songs
Songs with lyrics by Pete Brown